The term Reichsstraße ("imperial road") was introduced in 1934 into Nazi Germany in place of the hitherto existing class of Fernverkehrsstraße ("trunk road") or FVS. On 17 January 1932, to improve road navigation in the Third Reich, the most important long distance routes (Fernverkehrsstraßen) were numbered. From 1934, when the so-called FVS were renamed as  Reichsstraßen, they were marked with yellow signs bearing their respective number in black. After the imperial motorways (Reichsautobahnen) the Reichsstraßen were the most important class of road within the jurisdiction of Nazi Germany.

The Reichsstraße routes and numbering systems were largely adopted for the Bundesstraßen ("federal roads") in the Federal Republic of Germany and the Fernverkehrsstraßen ("trunk roads") in the GDR.

System 

→ See: Bundesstraße#Classification and history in Germany

Abroad 

In several other countries, such as France, the equivalent roads are called national roads. In the Kingdom of Netherlands, Sweden and Norway the term Reichsweg ("imperial way") is used.

See also 

 Reichsautobahn
 Berlinka (autobahn)
 Riksväg

References

External links 
 Detailed route description for all the Reichsstraßen

Roads in Germany
Former roads